The Battle of Rohtas took place in middle of 1767 between the Durranis and the Sikh Misls. Sarfaraz Khan was appointed as the governor of Rohtas Fort by Ahmad Shah Abdali and he planned to capture Gujrat from Gujar Singh. But the plan leaked out causing Charat Singh and Gujar Singh to retaliate by capturing Rohtas which resulted with Sikh Victory and imprisonment of Sarfaraz Khan.

Background
Ahmad Shah Abdali appointed Sarfaraz Khan as the governor of Rohtas. The Fort had 350 to 400 houses, with about 1,200 of just Muslim civilian population living there, 30 shops and was large enough for 30,000 cavalry and 50,000 infantry to board there. The fort also had sufficient supply of water through tank, wells and baolis where about 100 people could retrieve the water at the same time through different passages. In addition there were also 67 villages that fell under the charge of the fort. Sarfaraz Khan decided to capture Gujrat from its ruler Gujar Singh but this plan was revealed and so Charat Singh and Gujar Singh sent leaders Raja Himmat Khan and Diwan Shiv Nath to meet Sarfaraz Khan at Rohtas from diverting his plan to attack Gujrat. But instead, both Himmat Khan and Shiv Nath were executed and their followers were imprisoned.

Battle
Charat Singh and Gujar Singh marched to Rohtas where Charat Singh had 500 horsemen and 1,000 infantry with him, whereas Gujar Singh had 400 horsemen and 1,000 footmen. In addition, about 1,000 young men from the territories of Gujar Singh and Charat Singh had also joined, looking for adventure and brought along few cannons with them. On the other hand, the Afghan garrison at Rohtas had 3,000 men and few guns. The Sikh chiefs besieged the fort, resulting in few guns in the forts firing at the Sikhs but the Sikhs stayed firm in their positions. The siege continued for 5 months with the supplies running short such as food, water and fodder and due to the fear of reaction from the Sikhs, the villagers feared to help the Afghan garrison with supplies. With no sign of reinforcement coming from Kandahar, the Muslim chiefs within the fort realized that they were incapable of defeating the Sikh domination and so Ali Muhammad of Gujar Khan and Sultan Khan Gakhar opened the gate to let the Sikhs enter, followed with the surrender of Afghan garrison and arrest and imprisonment of governor Sarfaraz Khan. The Sikhs brought the area from Rohtas to north of Rawalpindi under their control.

Aftermath
After the victory and capture of Rohtas, son of Himmat Khan, Ghias-ud-din, was made the governor of Rohtas. After imprisonment, Sarfaraz Khan was transferred to Ramnagar where he was later set free upon the payment of 78,000 rupees.  Later, after Ghias-ud-din's death, his cousin, Nur Khan was appointed as the governor of Rohtas and remained incharge for next 30 years. Following Nur Khan, Faizdad Khan took the succession and in 1808 Ranjit Singh appointed a Sikh as incharge of the fort. For the loyal services of Faizdad Khan's family, Ranjit Singh granted them one-fourth of the revenue.

References 

Sikh warriors
Battles involving the Sikhs
Sikh Empire